Andrea Belotti  (born 20 December 1993) is an Italian professional footballer who plays as a striker for  club Roma and the Italy national team.

Belotti started his career with AlbinoLeffe. He was later signed by Palermo, where he won a Serie B title in the 2013–14 season, before being signed by Torino in 2015. Belotti left the club in 2022 as their eighth-highest goalscorer of all time, and joined Roma on a free transfer.

A former Italy under-19, under-20 and under-21 international, Belotti took part in the UEFA European Under-21 Championship in 2015. He was given his senior national team debut in 2016 and was included in the Italy squad that won UEFA Euro 2020.

Early life
Andrea Belotti was born in Calcinate, a small town in close vicinity of Bergamo in northern Italy. He is nicknamed Il Gallo (The Rooster). The nickname comes from the surname of his close childhood friend, who jokingly suggested he celebrates his goals by mimicking a rooster's comb with an open hand to his forehead. Belotti was a childhood fan of AC Milan.

Club career

AlbinoLeffe
He took his first steps as a footballer in the oratory school of Gorlago, and with Grumellese. After an unsuccessful trial with Atalanta, he was signed by AlbinoLeffe and went through their youth system. He made his debut for the first team in the 2011–12 season, when he played eight matches in Serie B and scored two goals. He also scored 13 goals as team top-scorer for the youth team throughout the 2011–12 season, winning a youth title, the Trofeo Dossena, in June 2012.

The following season, he was fully promoted to the first team, and made 31 appearances in Lega Pro Prima Divisione, scoring 12 goals. He also made an appearance during the 2012–13 Coppa Italia. Given the presence in the squad of the defender Mauro Belotti, Andrea was nicknamed Belottino.

Palermo
On 2 September 2013, he was loaned for a fee of €500,000 (with a buyout clause set at €2.5 million) to Palermo in Serie B. He made his debut with the Sicilians on 24 September 2013, as a substitute for Davide Di Gennaro in a game against Bari, and provided an assist to Kyle Lafferty in a 2–1 loss. He scored his first goal for the Rosaneri on 5 October against Brescia. On 3 May 2014, he was promoted to Serie A after a 1–0 win away to Novara. He closed the season with 10 goals scored in the league. On 18 June 2014, Palermo exercised the right to redeem half of his contract in co-ownership, with an option to redeem the other half for €3.5 million.

He made his debut in Serie A on 31 August 2014, at age 20, as a substitute for Paulo Dybala in a 1–1 draw at home to Sampdoria. On 12 September, Palermo announced they had redeemed the remainder of his contract. On 24 September, he scored his first two career goals in Serie A, playing as a starter in a 3–3 draw away to Napoli. On 13 December, he scored the winning goal in injury time against Sassuolo, securing a 2–1 win for Palermo and their seventh consecutive useful result (equalling the record of the 2009–10 season under the coach Delio Rossi). He played in 38 games throughout the season, largely as a substitute, in which he scored six goals.

Torino

On 18 August 2015, he was officially signed by Torino for a reported fee of €7.5 million. He scored his first goal for Torino in a 2–0 win against Bologna. On 16 January 2016, he scored his first brace for the club in a 4–2 win over Frosinone. On 20 March, he scored from the penalty spot in the 48th minute to halt Juventus goalkeeper Gianluigi Buffon's record of longest consecutive minutes not conceded in a 4–1 home defeat. He concluded the 2015–16 season with 12 goals in 35 appearances.

He began the 2016–17 season scoring a header against AC Milan at the San Siro, but had a penalty saved by Gianluigi Donnarumma in a 3–2 defeat. The following round, on 28 August, he scored his first career hat-trick in a 5–1 home win against Bologna. On 4 December 2016, he extended his contract with Torino until 2021, with a €100 million release clause valid only to foreign clubs. On 5 March 2017, he wore the captain's armband for the first time against Palermo, in which he scored the fastest hat-trick in Serie A since 30 January 2000 (seven minutes and 15 seconds), surpassing the previous record belonging to the Ukrainian Andriy Shevchenko. The following month, he became the first player under the age of 24 to score 24 goals in a single Serie A season since Shevchenko in 1999–00. He ended the season with 26 goals in 35 appearances, and as the third top-scorer in the league behind Edin Džeko of Roma (29) and Dries Mertens of Napoli (28).

After being appointed team captain on a permanent basis, he scored his first goal of the 2017–18 season with a scissor-kick in a 3–0 win against Sassuolo. Often injured, he was unable to repeat his performance of the previous season, scoring 10 goals in Serie A.

On 26 August 2018, Belotti scored his first goal of the 2018–19 season in a 2–2 draw against Inter Milan at the San Siro. On 4 November, he scored his first brace of the season in a 4–1 away win against Sampdoria. On 25 May, he scored the second scissor kick goal of his career, once again against Sassuolo. In virtue of his performance during the season, he was voted as Torino's player of the year (succeeding Nicolas Nkoulou). Belotti concluded the season with 15 goals in Serie A - contributing to Torino's qualification to the 2019–20 UEFA Europa League, after the exclusion of Milan.

On 25 July 2019, Belotti made his debut in UEFA competitions, in the first qualifying round of the Europa League against Debrecen, scoring the opening goal on a penalty kick. On 29 August, Belotti scored with a header against Wolverhampton to record his 77th goal for Torino, entering in Torino's top 10 goalscorers of all-time. On 26 September, he scored his first brace of the season in a 2–1 win over Milan. On 23 June 2020, by virtue a goal scored in a home match against Udinese (1–0), he reached double-figures in Serie A for the fifth consecutive season. On 16 July 2020, Belotti scored in his seventh Serie A match in a row in a 3–0 win over Genoa.

On 12 December 2020, in a league match lost 3–2 at home against Udinese, he scored his 100th goal for Torino in all competitions, equalling Adolfo Baloncieri in the club's all-time scorer list. On 30 January 2021, with a goal scored at Fiorentina, Belotti achieved double figures in the league for all six season played in Serie A with Torino (behind only Paolo Pulici, who achieved double figures for seven consecutive years between 1972 and 1979).

Belotti began his seventh consecutive season with Torino scoring a goal in a 2–1 loss at home to Atalanta. On 30 October 2021, Belotti scored the final goal in a 3–0 win against Sampdoria, achieving the milestone of 100 goals in Serie A (94 goals scored, up to that moment with Torino in seven season and six goals with Palermo).

On 1 July 2022, Torino announced that Belotti would not extend and leave for free.

A.S Roma 
On 28 August 2022, Belotti signed an initial one-year contract with Roma that runs until 30 June 2023. As part of the overall agreement there is also the option for an additional two-year extension, based on certain performance-related criteria.

He scored his first goal for Roma against Cremonese in the Coppa Italia on 1 February 2023.

International career

Youth 
Belotti received his first call-up to the Italy under-19 side in December 2011 against the Lega Pro representative squad; he scored a goal in the match, which the under-19 side won 4–2. In the 2012 UEFA European Under-19 Football Championship elite qualification round he featured as Italy's centre-forward in the team's 4–2–3–1 formation, scoring once in three appearances.

Belotti made nine appearances for the under-20 (scoring four goals), before making his debut for the under-21 team on 14 August 2013 in a 4–1 friendly victory against Slovakia. On 5 September he featured in the 2015 UEFA European Under-21 Championship qualification 3–1 loss at home to Belgium, later scoring his first goal in the group on 14 November, in a 3–0 win against Northern Ireland. On 5 September 2014 he scored his first brace for the team in a European Championship qualifier against Serbia, which ended in a 3–2 victory for Italy.

Under manager Luigi Di Biagio, Belotti took part in the 2015 UEFA European Under-21 Championship in the Czech Republic, scoring the opening goal in a 3–1 defeat of England in Italy's final group match, although the result was not enough to see the Italian under-21 side progress to the semi-finals, as the azzurrini finished third in their group, behind the two eventual finalists Portugal and Sweden.

Senior 
On 27 August 2016, Belotti was called up to the senior squad for the first time by Gian Piero Ventura for a friendly against France on 1 September and a 2018 World Cup qualification match on 5 September against Israel. He made his senior international debut in the friendly against France, coming on as a substitute in a 3–1 home loss. Belotti scored his first senior goal on 9 October, the opening goal of their third World Cup qualification match, a 3–2 away victory over Macedonia.

In June 2021, Belotti was included in Italy's squad for UEFA Euro 2020 by manager Roberto Mancini. On 6 July, following a 1–1 draw after extra-time against Spain in the semi-final of the competition, Belotti scored Italy's second spot-kick in an eventual 4–2 penalty shoot-out victory, to send Italy to the final. On 11 July, Belotti won the European Championship with Italy following a 3–2 penalty shoot-out victory over England at Wembley Stadium in the final, after a 1–1 draw in extra-time; Belotti came on as a substitute late in the second half of regulation time for Lorenzo Insigne, and in the shoot-out, he took Italy's second penalty, which was saved by Jordan Pickford.

Style of play

Belotti began his career as a midfielder and winger, but under the guidance of AlbinoLeffe's youth coach Alessio Pala, was converted to a forward. Compared to Gianluca Vialli for his athleticism and style of play, Belotti is a quick, physical, and prolific striker, who has a strong and powerful shot with either foot. He is strong in aerial duels, and stands out for his acceleration, tactical intelligence, positioning, work-rate, and eye for goal, which, along with his speed, allows him to lose his markers by making attacking runs into the penalty area. Although he is primarily deployed as an out-and-out striker or centre-forward, he is also capable of playing as a second striker, due to his ability to hold up the ball with his back to goal and link-up with teammates, in addition to scoring goals himself.

An acrobatic player, he has also scored several overhead kick goals in his career.

Personal life
Belotti married Giorgia Duro on 15 June 2017.
They have a dog called Angi. In February 2021, Belotti tested positive for COVID-19 amid its pandemic in Italy; during his isolation period, his wife gave birth to their daughter Vittoria on 22 February.

Career statistics

Club

International

Scores and results list Italy's goal tally first, score column indicates score after each Belotti goal.

Honours

Palermo
Serie B: 2013–14

Italy
 UEFA European Championship: 2020

Individual
Pallone d'Argento: 2016–17
Giuseppe Prisco Award: 2017
Gazzetta Sports Awards Performance of the Year: 2017
Premio Nazionale Carriera Esemplare "Gaetano Scirea": 2020

Orders
 5th Class / Knight: Cavaliere Ordine al Merito della Repubblica Italiana: 2021

References

External links

Profile at the A.S. Roma website
Andrea Belotti Profile at FIGC.it 

1993 births
Living people
People from Calcinate
Sportspeople from the Province of Bergamo
Italian footballers
Footballers from Lombardy
Association football forwards
Italy international footballers
Italy under-21 international footballers
Italy youth international footballers
UEFA European Championship-winning players
UEFA Euro 2020 players
U.C. AlbinoLeffe players
Palermo F.C. players
Torino F.C. players
A.S. Roma players
Serie A players
Serie B players
Serie C players
Knights of the Order of Merit of the Italian Republic